Molecular gyroscopes are chemical compounds or supramolecular complexes containing a rotor that moves freely relative to a stator, and therefore act as gyroscopes. Though any single bond or triple bond permits a chemical group to freely rotate, the compounds described as gyroscopes may protect the rotor from interactions, such as in a crystal structure with low packing density or by physically surrounding the rotor avoiding steric contact. A qualitative distinction can be made based on whether the activation energy needed to overcome rotational barriers is higher than the available thermal energy. If the activation energy required is higher than the available thermal energy, the rotor undergoes "site exchange", jumping in discrete steps between local energy minima on the potential energy surface. If there is thermal energy sufficiently higher than that needed to overcome the barrier to rotation, the molecular rotor can behave more like a macroscopic freely rotating inertial mass.

For example, several studies in 2002 with a p-phenylene rotor found that some structures using variable-temperature (VT) solid-state 13C CPMAS and quadrupolar echo 2H NMR were able to detect a two-site exchange rate of 1.6 MHz (over 106/second at 65 °C), described as "remarkably fast for a phenylene group in a crystalline solid", with steric barriers of 12–14 kcal/mol. However, tert-butyl modification of the rotor increased the exchange rate to over 108 per second at room temperature, and the rate for inertially rotating p-phenylene without barriers is estimated to be approximately 2.4 x 1012 revolutions per second.

References 

Supramolecular chemistry
Chemical physics